Estoublon is a commune in the Alpes-de-Haute-Provence department in Provence-Alpes-Côte d'Azur in southeastern France.

Geography
The river Asse flows southwest through the western part of the commune.

Population

See also
Communes of the Alpes-de-Haute-Provence department

References

Communes of Alpes-de-Haute-Provence
Alpes-de-Haute-Provence communes articles needing translation from French Wikipedia